Smin Bayan (or သမိန် ပရမ်း, ; also spelled Smin Baram, Thamein Bayan, Thamein Payan) was an early 15th century commander who fought on both sides of the Forty Years' War between Hanthawaddy Pegu and Ava. He is best known in Burmese history for successfully driving back a Chinese invasion in 1414–1415 on behalf of his former enemy Ava.

A son-in-law of King Razadarit of Pegu, Bayan defected to Ava soon after being captured in battle in 1414. For his success against the Chinese, he was made governor of Legaing by King Minkhaung I of Ava. In 1423, less than two years after the deaths of Minkhaung and Razadarit, the commander returned to his native land. He led the Hanthawaddy army in the successful 1430–1431 campaign against Ava.

Background
Smin Bayan was a Mon language title worn by successive commanders in the service of the monarchs of Hanthawaddy Pegu. This article is about the first of the two most prominent Smin Bayans, whose stories are featured in the royal chronicles.

Chronicles provide little information about the background of the first Smin Bayan. His previous title was Smin Upakaung (သမိန် ဥပါကောင်း), and his personal name was Athayi (အသရီ). He had an elder brother who was married to Princess Tala Mi Saw, daughter of King Razadarit of Hanthawaddy Pegu. Based on the language used in the chronicles, he was probably born in the 1380s, and related to the royal family.

Early career

Invasion of Ava (1401–1402)
In 1401, Athayi was an officer in the Hanthawaddy army that invaded the northern Ava Kingdom to renew the Forty Years' War. He initially served as the deputy commander of the regiment led by his elder brother. But he soon became the commander early in the campaign after his brother was killed in the battle of Myede. Despite some early successes, the invasion ultimately sputtered. It was during the withdrawal in 1402 that Athayi made his name. In a rearguard action, his undermanned cavalry is said to have driven back an elite Ava cavalry corps, either near Pagan (Bagan) or Sale. In one version, he is said to have fought off the two best Ava cavalry officers, Chit Swe and Chit Thin, while another says he fought off several Ava cavalry even after having been hit with a spear on one of his legs and having been thrown off his horse; the Ava troops retreated, thinking the man was possessed. In both versions, King Razadarit is said to have witnessed the battle, and was extremely impressed by the young officer's performance.

Rise to prominence
Once back in the southern country, Razadarit rewarded those who served with distinction and punished those who fled. The king ordered the execution of Saw Maha-Rit, one of his sons-in-law, for fleeing the scene at the battle of Prome, and for losing Princess Tala Mi Kyaw to Ava forces. On the other hand, Razadarit awarded Athayi the title of Smin Upakaung, which was the title of Athayi's fallen brother, and married him to Princess Tala Mi Saw. In essence, Athayi had succeeded both the title and wife of his late brother. The king also appointed his new son-in-law governor of Hpaunghnin. However, Upakaung Athayi probably held the governorship of the district located inside Ava's traditional borders for at most a few months, if at all, since Ava forces went on to recapture all Ava lands by the end of 1402. The two kingdoms reached a truce in 1403 that restored the prewar border, south of Prome. Chronicles do not say if Razadarit gave Upakaung another governorship.

Renewal of war (1408–1414)

Upakaung was again called into service when Razadarit renewed the war in 1408. The frontline commander served with distinction until he was captured by the enemy in 1414.

Even before his capture, Upakaung had long been noticed by the Ava high command. He was one of the commanders that drove back the Ava forces led by King Minkhaung I in 1408. In 1412–1413, he repeatedly held off Crown Prince Minye Kyawswa near Prome (Pyay). So impressed was Minye Kyawswa that he tried to get Upakaung to defect. The crown prince asked to meet Upakaung in person under the guise of a truce negotiation. When they met near Talezi, on the west bank of the Irrawaddy river near Prome, Minye Kyawswa offered Upakaung a prominent governorship on par with the governorship of Prome. Upakaung refused the offer.

But he could not stem the tide of war. In late 1414, now known by his new title of Smin Bayan (Smin Baram), he led a counterattack on Ava supply lines. But Minye Kyawswa beat back the attack, and captured Bayan and 20 other senior Hanthawaddy commanders. The crown prince took a break from the campaign, and made a 17-day trip to personally bring Bayan to Ava (Inwa), before returning to the southern front.

In Ava's service (by 1415–1423)
At Ava, Bayan was initially put in prison. He soon decided to switch sides, agreeing to fight for Ava against an invading Chinese army. According to the Burmese chronicles, he was instrumental in driving back the Chinese. For this victory, he is mythologized and celebrated in Burmese history. While chronicles perhaps simplistically state he switched sides because he did not want to be in prison forever, modern Burmese narratives have portrayed Bayan's decision in pan-Burmese nationalist terms, as overcoming internal differences between fraternal Burmese nations and fighting against a common foreign aggressor.

Chinese invasion (1414–1415)

Whatever drove him to defect, Bayan was agreeing to fight against Pegu's key ally, China. The Ming court had been alarmed by Ava's conquests of the nearer Shan states, which it considered its vassals, in 1403–1406, and had supported Razadarit, characteristically recognizing the Hanthawaddy king as its "governor". It had also authorized annual attacks by its own Yunnan-based troops as well as those of its vassal Shan states along the border on Ava's northern territories since 1412. Its 1412–1413 and 1413–1414 invasions were serious enough that Minkhaung had to redeploy Minye Kyawswa to the northern front each time, providing much-needed breathing room for Pegu.

In late 1414, as Ava forces began their assault on the central Pegu province, the Chinese again opened the northern front. According to the Burmese chronicles, King Minkhaung did not deem the invasion this time to be serious enough. Instead of recalling Minye Kyawswa and the main armies as he did in the previous years, Minkhaung sent just a small army this time. But the Chinese army is said to have advanced all the way to Ava (Inwa) and laid siege to the Burmese capital. After a month of siege,  January 1415, both sides agreed to settle the matters with a duel on horseback between their chosen champions. The Chinese would retreat if their champion lost; but Ava would become a tributary of China if the Ava champion lost. Chronicles continue that the king searched for the best horseback fighter in the city, and convinced Bayan, a highly acclaimed cavalry officer, to represent the Ava side. Bayan defeated the Ming champion in the duel, and the Chinese forces retreated.

The chronicle story has many issues. First, the Ming records do not say any of their expeditions in the 1410s reached the Burmese capital, or provide any of the details found in the Burmese chronicles. Furthermore, the chronicles do not explain why Minkhaung did not recall his main forces during the month-long siege; why he would risk the fate of his kingdom on the outcome of a duel in which his champion was a recent defector from Pegu; or why the Chinese command would agree to a duel if their army had already advanced to the Burmese capital. In any case, the story, according to Than Tun, lacks credibility and "historicity".

Governor of Legaing (1415–1423)

At any rate, the former Hanthawaddy commander apparently played a key role in driving back the Chinese, even if the stakes were not as high or the events were not as dramatic as chronicles make them out to be. For his service, Bayan was made governor of Legaing along with the regalia befitting a prince, and wedded to a younger daughter of Gov. Yazathu of Talok by a grateful Minkhaung. Bayan spent the next seven years in the northern kingdom. However, he apparently did not go to the southern front while Razadarit was alive.

Bayan went to the front only after the deaths of Minkhaung and Razadarit in 1421. In November 1422, he marched to the south alongside Thihathu (r. 1421–1425), the new king of Ava, in Ava's attempt to interfere in the succession crisis in Pegu. The invasion ended amicably in early 1423 in a peace treaty between Thihathu and Prince Binnya Ran, one of the pretenders to the Pegu throne.

For his part, Bayan saw an opportunity for him to return to his native land and be rehabilitated. Upon withdrawal of Ava troops, Bayan accompanied Thihathu on an elephant hunting trip in Tharrawaddy at the border. He made a break for the border during the hunting trip, shouting back to Thihathu as he rode away that he needed to return to his homeland as he missed his wife and family in the south.

Back in the native land
According to the main chronicles, Bayan entered Binnya Ran's service. In 1430, he was the overall commander of the Hanthawaddy army that attacked Prome (Pyay). It was an opportunistic attempt by Ran (r. 1424–1446) to pick off Ava's southern territories during a prolonged political turmoil at Ava. Ran was allied with Thinkhaya III of Toungoo, who had declared independence from Ava since 1426. (In addition to Bayan's 5000-strong army, Ran also sent in a naval flotilla carrying 5000 men. Thinkhaya sent another 5000 men.) The campaign went well for the allies, and King Mohnyin Thado of Ava (r. 1426–1439) reluctantly agreed to consider Ran's terms. While peace negotiations were taking place in Ava, Bayan visited his Ava counterpart Yazathingyan's camp several times, socializing with Yazathingyan, who was a close friend during Bayan's stay in the north. But King Thado, who had been incensed by Ran's demands, broke the protocol, and ordered Yazathingyan to arrest Bayan when the Hanthawaddy general visited the next time. Bayan was arrested at his next visit. However, Bayan was released shortly after as Thado and Ran reached a deal.

According to the Pak Lat Chronicles, an early 20th century Mon language chronicle of uncertain provenance and reliability, Bayan was made governor of Donwun by King Binnya Kyan of Pegu, and died after being attacked by a demon spirit. The supernatural nature of his death aside, Binnya Kyan was viceroy of Martaban, not king of Pegu. Although it is quite probable that Bayan would have held a prominent governorship—Donwun was the ancestral home of the dynasty—Pak Lat in general contains several unsubstantiated claims and mangled timelines that it is difficult to discern which parts of its narrative might be true.

Bayan is not mentioned again in the main chronicles after 1431. He may still have been alive in 1442/43 when his wife Princess Tala Mi Saw may have been appointed governor of Martaban; she is said to have still been married to a high ranking official, who presumably was Bayan.

Commemorations
Smin Bayan is commemorated in Myanmar with his name typically transliterated as Thamein Bayan or Thamain Bayan.

 Thamein Bayan Road, Tamwe Township, Yangon
 Thamein Bayan Road, Mawlamyine, Mon State
Thamein Bayan Street, Thingangyun Township, Yangon
Thamein Bayan Street, Dawbon Township, Yangon

List of campaigns
The following is a list of Smin Bayan Upakaung's military campaigns as reported in the chronicles.

Notes

References

Bibliography
 
 
 
 
 
 
 
 
 
 
 
 

1380s births
1400s deaths
Hanthawaddy dynasty
Burmese generals
Burmese people of Mon descent